El Kala is a district in El Taref Province, Algeria. It was named after its capital, El Kala. El Kala National Park is there.

Municipalities
The district is further divided into 4 municipalities:
El Kala
El Aïoun
Raml Souk
Souarekh

Districts of El Taref Province